Founded in 1992 (first incorporated as Bowen Designs, Inc. in 1991), Bowen Designs was a company dealing in the creation and sale of entertainment-based collectible statues.  Most Bowen products released thus far are based on Marvel Comics characters, but products based on independent comics and movies have also been created.

The primary designer and sculptor for Bowen Designs is Randy Bowen.  He started as a garage kit creator and throughout the years became a well-known sculptor in the industry.  Currently, Bowen Designs consists of many more people and often employs freelance sculptors and prototype painters due to the large amount of product being released.  Bowen Design's produces mostly statues and busts based on heroes and villains of the Marvel Universe.

The Marvel License

Bowen Designs' tie to Marvel Comics began as early as 1997.  In May 1998, Bowen released the first Bowen Marvel Mini-Bust in the line (The Hulk).  In December 1998, the first in a series of Bowen Marvel Statues hit the market (Daredevil).  The license once covered mini-statues, done much smaller than Bowen's other Marvel statues, but few were released and the mini-statues were not revisited.  The Marvel license periods were broken up into "phases," where a new phase was started upon confirmation of renewal of the license.  Phase 5 was the last phase to be produced, leaving Bowen Designs future with the Marvel license in the dark.  Attributing factors to the lack of renewal for a Phase 6 may include Marvel being acquired by Disney.  It is unknown if Bowen Designs will pursue a renewal of the Marvel License, or even if Disney/Marvel would be open to it.  Randy Bowen recently announced that the company will come back at some point with new statues, but the announcement failed to specify what kind of statues or what properties any future productions might encompass.

MYTHOS Editions
The MYTHOS line was conceived as a way for Bowen Designs to release statues related to licenses that are in the public domain.  This includes mostly mythology based pieces so far.  Being untied to any sort of license agreement, this gives the sculptor and designer free rein over all aspects of the character sculpt.

Sculptors
Sculptors employed by Bowen Designs for various projects include:

Randy Bowen-main sculptor
Tim Bruckner
Ulises Cantu
Stephen Hickman
The Kucharek Brothers
Thomas Kuntz
Jim Maddox
Barsom Manashian
Tony Mcvey
Joseph Menna
Mark Newman
Gabe Perna
Ruben Procopio
The Shiflett Brothers
Erick Sosa 
Joy and Tom Studios
Carl Surges
Neil Surges
Seth Vandable
Ray Villafane

And many others...

Prototype Painters

Prototype Painters employed by Bowen Designs for various projects include:

John Ficchi
Saul Alavrez
Randy Lambert
Dan Cope

And many others...

Products
Gargoyle

References

 Bowen Designs Official Site
 Statue Forum
 Statue Marvels 

Marvel Comics action figure lines
Action figures
Toy companies of the United States